Vincent Savolainen is a biologist.

Savolainen was born on 27 September 1966. He is of Finnish origin and holds Swiss, British, and French citizenship. Savolainen earned his undergraduate degree from the University of Geneva and obtained his doctorate at the same institution, three years before Philippe Cuénoud. He teaches at Imperial College London. Savolainen was elected fellow and the 2006 recipient of the Bicentenary Medal awarded by the Linnean Society. In 2009, the Royal Society of Biology granted Savolainen fellowship. Following his election as a member of the European Molecular Biology Organisation in 2014, the Zoological Society of London awarded Savolainen fellowship in 2015.

References

1966 births
Living people
20th-century British biologists
20th-century French biologists
Swiss biologists
21st-century British biologists
University of Geneva alumni
Academics of Imperial College London
Fellows of the Royal Society of Biology
Fellows of the Linnean Society of London
Fellows of the Zoological Society of London
Members of the European Molecular Biology Organization